Brazile is a surname. It originated from an African-American Vernacular English word for the country of Brazil. Notable people with the surname include:

 Donna Brazile (born 1959), American political strategist, campaign manager, and political analyst
 Robert Brazile (born 1953), American football player
 Trevor Brazile (born 1976), American rodeo champion

See also
 Brazil